Parkinsoniidae is a family of ammonites belonging to the order Ammonitida. The cephalopod family lived from the Bajocian stage to the Bathonian age of the Middle Jurassic.

References

Jurassic ammonites
Bajocian first appearances
Middle Jurassic extinctions
Ammonitida families
Perisphinctoidea